State Route 308 (SR 308) is a north–south state highway in the central portion of Ohio, a U.S. state.

Route description

SR 308 runs exclusively in the central portion of Knox County. The route is not a part of the National Highway System.

History
When first designated in 1932, SR 308 was a spur route connecting US 36 with the village of Gambier and Kenyon College. It would be 1939 before SR 308 would become a connector route, when SR 229 was extended east of Mount Vernon, and in the process connected with SR 308 at its southern terminus.

Major intersections

References

308
Transportation in Knox County, Ohio